Nicolas Dominique Adam (18 September 1881 – 15 February 1957) was a Luxembourgian gymnast, born in Esch-sur-Alzette, who competed in the 1912 Summer Olympics. In 1912 he was a member of the Luxembourgian team which finished fourth in the team, European system competition and fifth in the team, free system event.

References

External links
 list of Luxembourgian gymnasts
 Nicolas Adam's profile at Sports Reference.com

1881 births
1957 deaths
Sportspeople from Esch-sur-Alzette
Luxembourgian male artistic gymnasts
Olympic gymnasts of Luxembourg
Gymnasts at the 1912 Summer Olympics
20th-century Luxembourgian people